Davey J. Williams (1952, York, Alabama – April 5, 2019) was an American free improvisation and avant-garde music guitarist. In addition to his solo work, he was noted for his membership in Curlew and his collaborations with LaDonna Smith.

Biography
Williams began playing guitar when he was 12. He played in rock bands in high school, and studied with blues musician Johnny Shines from the late 1960s until 1971. In the early 1970s Williams played in the University of Alabama B Jazz Ensemble and the Salt & Pepper Soul Band. He also started working with LaDonna Smith around this time, and founded a musical ensemble and recording project called Transmuseq. He toured the U.S. and Europe in 1978. In the early 1980s he worked in a blues band called Trains in Trouble.  In 1986 Williams joined Curlew, who released several albums on Cuneiform Records in the 1990s.

In the 1980s he also worked with Col. Bruce Hampton and OK, Nurse, and in the early 1990s played in a punk rock band called Fuzzy Sons. Williams played in an improvisational three-piece called Say What?, and worked with Jim Staley and Ikue Mori. Williams appeared live at some 1,500 concerts worldwide.

Williams co-founded The Improviser, a journal of experimental music, in 1981. He also worked as a music critic for the Birmingham News and published freelance criticism elsewhere.

Williams died in Birmingham, Alabama on April 5, 2019, from cancer.

Discography
Trans with LaDonna Smith, Theodore Bowen, Timothy Reed, Jim Hearon, [TransMuseq] 1977
Raudelunas Pataphysical Revue [Say Day Bew]  1979
Folk Music, LaDonna Smith, Ted Bowen, [TransMuseq] 1978
Jewels with Anne LeBaron, LaDonna Smith, [TransMuseq] 1979
Two Thousand Statues [John Zorn] -The English Channel [Eugene Chadbourne]  1977-1978
School [John Zorn] with LaDonna Smith, Eugene Chadbourne [Parachute] 1979
Velocities with LaDonna Smith, Andrea Centazzo, 1979
Direct Waves with LaDonna Smith, 1980
USA Tour with Andrea Centazzo, LaDonna Smith, [Ictus] 1980
Ham Days with Udo Bergner, Herbert Janssen, Torsten Muller, LaDonna Smith [Fremuco Records] 1981
Alchemical Rowdies with LaDonna Smith. Pippin Barnett, Danny Finney, Paul Watson, [TransMuseq]  1982
White Earth Streak with LaDonna Smith, Gunter Christmann, [TransMuseq] 1983
Song of Aeropteryx, with LaDonna Smith, Hal Rammel, [TransMuseq]1983
Criminal Pursuits, solo guitar improvisations [TransMuseq] 1985 
Locales for Ecstasy with LaDonna Smith, Cinnie Cole, [TransMuseq] 1987
Dix Improvisations with LaDonna Smith, [Victo 1989] 
Travellers with LaDonna Smith [TransMuseq] 1990
the Aerial #2, with LaDonna Smith [Non Sequitor] 1990
Say What! with Steve Noble, Oren Marshall, 1992
Slide Crazy [Sky Ranch 1992]
Transmutating with LaDonna Smith, [TransMuseq] 1993
A Confederacy of Dances, with LaDonna Smith [Einstein Records] 1994
Northern Dancer with Jim Staley, Ikue Mori, 1996
Tarot or Aorta memories of a PRE festival with LaDonna Smith [smackshire] 1996
I Scream [goldplo-limited edition-atlanta] 1997
Charmed, I'm Sure [Ecstatic Peace] 1997 
Carbon [Table of the Elements] 1997
Texas Was Delicious (Megalon Records, 2000)
Humdinger [Atavistic Records] 2001 
Numb Right [Megalon]  2002 
Antenna Road [TransMuseq] 2008
Cooking With Dynamite! - Hawk Tubley & The Airtight Chiefs  2011 
Halcyon Days with Andrea Centazzo, LaDonna Smith [Ictus] 2011
Sequana Sessions with LaDonna Smith [TransMuseq] 2015
Fresh Dirt Submergence! Sympatica  [Fresh Dirt] 2016 
More Requia, In Memory of Great Ancestors  Henry Kaiser [Metalanguage] 2020

References

[ Davey Williams] at Allmusic

1952 births
2019 deaths
American experimental musicians

Curlew (band) members

Avant-garde guitarists
American experimental guitarists
Deaths from cancer in Alabama
Guitarists from Alabama
People from Sumter County, Alabama
Atavistic Records artists
Surrealist artists